The San Esteban Island mouse (Peromyscus stephani) is a species of rodent in the family Cricetidae. It is endemic to Mexico, where it is known only from San Esteban Island in the northern Gulf of California.

References

San Esteban Island mouse
Endemic mammals of Mexico
Rodents of North America
Fauna of Gulf of California islands
Natural history of Sonora
Mammals described in 1912
Taxa named by John Kirk Townsend
Taxonomy articles created by Polbot